Shaun Jamal Phillips (born May 13, 1981) is a former American football linebacker. He played college football for Purdue and was drafted by the San Diego Chargers in the fourth round of the 2004 NFL Draft. Phillips has also been a member of the Denver Broncos, Tennessee Titans, and Indianapolis Colts.

Early years 
Phillips grew up in Willingboro, New Jersey and attended Willingboro High School, lettering in football, basketball, and track. In football, he was an All-City selection, an All-South Jersey selection, and an All-State selection.

College career 
Phillips accepted a scholarship offer to attend Purdue University following high school, choosing Purdue in part due to his desire to catch passes from quarterback Drew Brees as a tight end.

After being forced to sit out his freshman season due to low standardized test scores, Phillips was immediately assigned to the defensive side of the ball, and started as a freshman at defensive end. He earned All-Big Ten honorable mention in each of his first three seasons.

As a senior, Phillips totaled 14.5 sacks, pushing his career total to 33.5, a school record, highlighted by a 3.5 sack performance in Purdue's 26–23 win at Wisconsin Badgers. He was named a second-team All-American and first-team All-Big Ten performer.  Phillips started 49 consecutive games as a Boilermaker.

Phillips was often used on offense as a tight end in goal line situations, and caught two touchdown passes during his career. He completed his collegiate career at Purdue University as the school's all-time leader with 33.5 career sacks while ranking third in team annals with 60.5 tackles for a loss.

Shaun Phillips graduated from Purdue University in May 2003 with a degree in restaurant, hotel and institutional management.

Professional career 

Phillips was drafted by the Chargers 98th overall in the fourth round of the 2004 NFL Draft and was the 3rd Purdue player selected after Nick Hardwick and Stuart Schweigert, who both went in the 3rd round.

San Diego Chargers

In his rookie season, Philips was used as a backup pass rush specialist. He played in all 16 games and was second on the team with four sacks. He also forced 2 fumbles.

In 2005, in the same role, Philips had 7 sacks while playing alongside rookie sensation Shawne Merriman.

On April 14, 2006, Shaun Phillips was arrested after he scuffled with a patrol officer. Phillips, then  24, was booked into San Diego County jail on a charge of obstructing or resisting an officer in the performance of his duty. Phillips was freed after posting $10,000 bail, according to the Sheriff's Department.

Prior to the 2006 season, Phillips had mostly been used as a pass rush specialist rather than an every-down linebacker. But with the September 2006 shooting of teammate Steve Foley, Phillips moved into the starting right outside linebacker spot previously occupied by Foley. He made an instant impact and finished his first season as a starter tied for 9th in sacks in the NFL despite missing 2 games with a mid-season calf injury. He was a second alternate for the 2007 Pro Bowl

He and Shawne Merriman produced 28 sacks as they formed one of the best pass rush in the NFL. Philips finished with 65 tackles, 11.5 sacks, six pass breakups and four forced fumbles despite missing two games with an ankle injury.

Following the 2006 season, the Chargers signed Shaun Phillips to a six-year extension through 2012.  The deal guaranteed him $13 million over the first two years. He was originally scheduled for restricted free agency.

In his Fourth year, he emerged as a leader on the defense.  He started in 15 games and tacked on 68 tackles, 8.5 sacks, two interceptions and a touchdown.

In 2008, he appeared in 16 games with 16 starts.  He tacked on 74 tackles, 7.5 sacks and 4 pass defenses.

In 2009, Philips led the NFL with a career-best seven forced fumbles in 2009 while leading San Diego to its fourth consecutive AFC West title. Before the season, Phillips was cited for misdemeanor battery for allegedly striking a security guard in the face at a downtown hotel early Sunday morning. It was Phillips' second run-in with the law in three seasons.

In the 2010 season, the pass rusher played in all 16 games and finished with 55 tackles and a team-high 11 sacks. He also registered an interception that he returned 31 yards for a touchdown and was named to his first Pro Bowl. He was named AFC Defensive Player of the Week after producing a career-high four sacks and an interception returned for a touchdown vs. Arizona

Coming off a Pro Bowl year, Phillips was hurt and slowed by a lingering foot injury. He had 3.5 sacks, a career low, and two interceptions in 12 games.

Denver Broncos
On April 27, 2013, Phillips signed with the Denver Broncos. On June 24, 2013, Phillips says he accepted less money to play for the Broncos. "That's why I came here, to be in this situation, to be with a team that is right there in the mix," Phillips said.

In his debut as a Bronco, Phillips had 2.5 sacks on Baltimore Ravens quarterback Joe Flacco. On the season, he played in all 16 games, starting 12 (including the final 9 straight), finishing the season with 35 tackles (28 solo), 10 sacks, a pair of forced fumbles, an interception, and 5 blocked passes. In Week 8, Phillips intercepted Redskins quarterback Kirk Cousins, to seal the game for the Broncos.

Tennessee Titans
Phillips signed with the Tennessee Titans on March 28, 2014.  Phillips tallied a total of 19 tackles and 2 sacks in 11 games (1 as a starter) with the Titans. On November 25, 2014, Phillips was released by the Titans.

Indianapolis Colts
Phillips was signed off waivers by the Indianapolis Colts on November 26, 2014. He was released on February 16, 2015.

NFL career statistics

References

External links 
Shaun Phillips Official Website

Shaun Phillips Official Blog on Yardbarker
Tennessee Titans bio
San Diego Chargers bio
Purdue Boilermakers bio

1981 births
Living people
People from Willingboro Township, New Jersey
Players of American football from New Jersey
American football linebackers
American football defensive ends
Purdue Boilermakers football players
San Diego Chargers players
Denver Broncos players
Tennessee Titans players
Indianapolis Colts players
Willingboro High School alumni